Lyon Township is an inactive township in Knox County, in the U.S. state of Missouri.

Lyon Township was established in 1860, taking its name from Hezekiah Lyon, a local judge.

References

Townships in Missouri
Townships in Knox County, Missouri